Steve Ralston (born June 14, 1974) is an American retired soccer player and manager who played as a midfielder. He spent most of his playing career in Major League Soccer with the Tampa Bay Mutiny and the New England Revolution, retiring in 2010 as the league's all-time career leader in assists (135), appearances (378), starts (372), and minutes played (33,143). He also held the U.S. record for professional appearances (412) in 2010. He served as assistant manager at several teams, including the Houston Dynamo and San Jose Earthquakes, including a brief stint as the interim head coach at the Earthquakes in 2018.

Club career
Ralston was drafted 18th overall in the 1996 MLS College Draft by the Tampa Bay Mutiny out of Florida International University, and proceeded to become the first MLS player to win the Rookie of the Year Award.  Ralston played for the Mutiny for six years, leaving only after the team was contracted in 2002. He was Tampa Bay's all-time leader in games played (177) and points (130). he then joined the New England Revolution. In his first year with the Revolution, Ralston led the league in assists with 19. In thirteen years in the league, he scored 76 goals and had 135 assists in 378 regular season matches, and added three goals and five assists in 30 playoff matches. He also served as captain for several seasons with New England.

Soon after leaving New England, Ralston became the first ever signing of new USSF Division 2 club AC St. Louis. Ralston was one of the team's starting midfielders, and an assistant coach to head coach Claude Anelka.

After AC St. Louis ran in to financial difficulties, Ralston agreed to leave by mutual consent and immediately joined up with his former club New England Revolution.

In Ralston's first appearance back with the New England Revolution, he suffered a left elbow dislocation. In July 2010, he announced his retirement.

International career
Ralston appeared for the United States national team 36 times over an 11-year span and scored 4 international goals. His first cap came on January 17, 1997 against Peru. His last was for the squad that won the 2007 CONCACAF Gold Cup. He was never selected to a World Cup roster.

Ralston had a break out year for the [United States national team in 2005 by earning 15 caps. He scored the game-winning goal in a World Cup qualifying match against Mexico on September 3, 2005. The victory for the United States clinched qualification in the 2006 FIFA World Cup. Due to a later injury, he was only listed as an alternate for the United States at the World Cup.

Coaching career 

After his signing with AC St. Louis was named as the new assistant coach of the club. In July 2010, Raltson took an assistant coaching job at the Houston Dynamo with his former teammate Dominic Kinnear from the Tampa Bay Mutiny. On January 6, 2015, the San Jose Earthquakes announced Ralston would join Kinnear in San Jose and once again serve as his assistant coach.

References

External links
 
 Houston Dynamo staff profile
 US Soccer profile

1974 births
Living people
American soccer players
Soccer players from St. Louis
FIU Panthers men's soccer players
United States men's international soccer players
CONCACAF Gold Cup-winning players
Major League Soccer players
Major League Soccer All-Stars
Tampa Bay Mutiny players
New England Revolution players
AC St. Louis players
USSF Division 2 Professional League players
2003 CONCACAF Gold Cup players
2005 CONCACAF Gold Cup players
2007 CONCACAF Gold Cup players
Tampa Bay Mutiny draft picks
Houston Dynamo FC non-playing staff
San Jose Earthquakes non-playing staff
Association football midfielders